Gold Apollo Co., Ltd. is a manufacturer specializing in wireless paging systems.

Overview
Founded by Mr. Hsu Ching-Kuang in October 1995. Gold Apollo is a company producing POCSAG/FLEX (protocol) pagers. At beginning of funding, Gold Apollo produced only numeric pagers and focused on the domestic market. In the late 1990s, Gold Apollo developed a whole new alphanumeric pager and started aiming worldwide markets. In order to fulfill international requirements. The company expanded their product-line such as RF transmitters, receivers and wireless LED displays. Recently, the company focuses on using these RF products for different applications in hospitals, restaurants and other facilities.

Products

 Receiver
 Transmitter
 In-House System
 Telemetry Control

Market distribution
 Asia Pacific: Australia, Bengal, India, Indonesia, Singapore, Taiwan 
 Middle East: Iran, Israel, Jordan, Lebanon, Saudi Arabia, U.A.E.
 North America: United States
 Europe: Austria, Belgium, Cyprus, Czech Republic, Denmark, Finland, France, Germany, Netherlands, Italy, Lithuania, Norway, Poland, Portugal, Romania, Russia, Slovenia, Spain, Sweden, Switzerland, Turkey, UK, Ukraine
 D/A/CH: Germany, Switzerland, Austria ... Distributor HMK Telekommunikation GmbH
 South America: Brazil, Chile, Paraguay, Venezuela

Research and development
 2014 Automatic programming POCSAG Transmitter, TE-505NA, TE-505RA
 2013:Wireless Nurse Call System, Wireless Emergency Call System, Table Call System, School Alarm System, All-in-One System A07TCP
 2010 8-line alphanumeric pager, VP-101PRO, LCM, IC, other key components
 2009 Alphanumeric paper ALA29, VP-300
 2008 Tone only pager ALA06 and ALA27, ALA28 charger
 2007 Gigantic rechargeable pager TA-100
 2006 Updated voice pager as VP-200 and VP-500
 2005 New model voice pager VP-100 and TE-210
 2004 Water resistant alphanumeric pager ALA27, ALA28 and transmitter TX-125
 2003 Advanced model alphanumeric pager ALA25, ALA26,transmitter TE-205,numeric LED display LDN3
numeric pager ALA01 and tone only pager ALA05
 2002 Launched the first transmitter TE-100 and walkie-talkie GP-100
 2001 New updated for walkie-talkie FRS-300 and released AP-901
 2000 New updated for AP-924 and AP-303/305
 1999 First walkie-talkie FRS-200 and vertical numeric pager AP-901
 1998 First alpha pager AP-800 and AP-302/502/300
 1997 New numeric pager AP-500/202/301 with radio function
 1996 Released first numeric pager AP-100/200
 1995 Gold Apollo established

Further reading
History of Pagers and Beepers

References 

Electronics companies of Taiwan
Private equity portfolio companies
Manufacturing companies established in 1995
Manufacturing companies based in New Taipei